The Kleene Award 
is awarded at the annual IEEE Symposium on Logic in Computer Science (LICS) to the author(s) of the best student paper(s). A paper qualifies as a student paper if each author is a student at the date of the submission. Also eligible are authors who have graduated only recently, provided the submitted paper is based on work carried out when he or she still was a student. The award decision is made by the Program Committee.

The award is named after Stephen Cole Kleene, who did pioneering work in the field of logic as related to computer science.

Past recipients 
Past recipients of the Kleene award are tabulated below.

See also

 List of computer science awards
 Machtey Award

Notes

External links
 Kleene award

Computer science awards